Merli is an Italian surname. Notable people with the surname include:

Adalberto Maria Merli (born 1938), Italian actor
Danio Merli (born 1956), Italian sprint canoeist
Francesco Merli (1887–1976), Italian opera singer
Franco Merli (born 1956), Italian actor
Gino J. Merli (1924–2002), United States Army Medal of Honor recipient
Maurizio Merli (1940–1989), Italian actor
Corrado Merli (1959), Italian footballer
Reidar Merli (1917–2007), Norwegian wrestler
Simone Merli, Italian Electronic musician and Music producer
Merli is also the name of a Vocaloid character.
Merlí is a television series produced by Catalan channel TV3.
 

Italian-language surnames